The 2008 European Rally Championship season was the 56th season of the FIA European Rally Championship. Italian driver Luca Rossetti won 4 of the 9 rallies to claim his first European rally championship title.

Calendar and winners
The calendar of the 2008 season consisted of only 9 events, after the ELPA Rally not taking place in that year. The remaining events were unchanged from the previous year.

Championship standings
For the final classification in a rally, the winner was awarded 10 points, the runner-up 8 and the third placed driver 6. Drivers ranked 4 to 8 got 5–4–3–2–1 point(s). Additionally, the top three of every leg got 3–2–1 point(s). Only drivers who participated in least 6 events qualified for the championship ranking.

References

External links
 Official website 

European Rally Championship
European Rally Championship seasons
Rally